Wu Shek Kok is a village in Sha Tau Kok, North District, Hong Kong.

Administration
Wu Shek Kok is a recognized village under the New Territories Small House Policy. It is one of the villages represented within the Sha Tau Kok District Rural Committee. For electoral purposes, Wu Shek Kok is part of the Sha Ta constituency, which is currently represented by Ko Wai-kei.

History
The villages of Ma Tseuk Leng (upper and lower), Yim Tso Ha, Wu Shek Kok and Au Ha formed a yeuk (a form of oath-sworn, inter-village, mutual-aid alliance.

Features
There is a Tin Hau temple in Wu Shek Kok.

Japanese World War II military facilities are located on a hill at Wu Shek Kok.

See also
 Starling Inlet

Further reading

References

External links

 Delineation of area of existing village Wu Shek Kok (Sha Tau Kok) for election of resident representative (2019 to 2022)
 Website dedicated to the Tin Hau Temple in Wu Shek Kok

Villages in North District, Hong Kong
Sha Tau Kok